is a 1984 Japanese film directed by Nobuhiko Obayashi, based on an original story by .

Plot
After her father's sudden death, a Japanese high school girl travels to the southwest Pacific archipelago of  New Caledonia in search of the location, which they had agreed to visit together, of the film's title. From her encounters with Japanese émigrés and locals, she learns where the real island closest to heaven may be found.

Cast
Tomoyo Harada

Tōru Minegishi
Miyoko Akaza
Shigeru Izumiya
Yukihiro Takahashi
Kayo Matsuo
Nenji Kobayashi
Hideo Murota
Nobuko Otowa

References

External links

The Island Closest to Heaven at the Japanese Movie Database 

1984 films
Films directed by Nobuhiko Obayashi
1980s Japanese-language films
1980s Japanese films